The Table, sometimes called Table Mountain, is a  high flow-dominated andesite tuya located  south of Garibaldi Lake,  northeast of Cheekye and  north of Mount Garibaldi, British Columbia, Canada.

The Table is almost impossible to climb because sections of the volcano have collapsed, creating steep and exceptionally rotten rock walls on all sides.

Geology

The Table is part of the Garibaldi Lake volcanic field, a volcanic field that includes a group of nine small andesitic stratovolcanoes and basaltic andesite vents formed during the early Holocene. This in turn is part of the Garibaldi Volcanic Belt and of the Cascade Volcanic Arc that run from southwestern British Columbia to northern California caused by subduction of the Juan de Fuca Plate and Explorer Plate under the North American Plate at the Cascadia subduction zone.

Canadian geologist Bill Mathews proposed in 1951 that The Table formed when magma intruded into and melted a vertical tube in the overlying Cordilleran Ice Sheet. The partially molten mass of hornblende-phyric andesite cooled as a large block, with gravity flattening its upper surface. Horizontal columns occur at numerous locations along the periphery of the mass. The absence of glacial erosion of the tuya suggests that it erupted during the early Holocene, just prior to the disappearance of the ice sheet. Similar formations can be found in the Wells Gray-Clearwater volcanic field, the Northern Cordilleran Volcanic Province and elsewhere in the Garibaldi Volcanic Belt.

In Film
The Table is featured in Agent Cody Banks and in Stargate: The Ark of Truth in which it is the site of the village where the Ark was hidden. The title sequence of the film features The Table, with a graphics overlay of the village superimposed on it, as well as an aerial tour of the Mount Garibaldi and Tantalus Range area.

See also

Cascade Volcanoes
Garibaldi Volcanic Belt
List of volcanoes in Canada
Volcanism of Canada
Volcanism of Western Canada

References

Sources
 
 
 

Volcanoes of British Columbia
Subduction volcanoes
Tuyas of Canada
Two-thousanders of British Columbia
Holocene volcanoes
Garibaldi Ranges
Garibaldi Lake volcanic field